Bavispe (municipality) is a municipality in Sonora in north-western Mexico. The municipality covers an area of 1,723 km2.

Demographics
As of 2010, the municipality had a total population of 1,454. The municipality has 12 localities, the largest of which (with 2010 populations in parentheses) were: Bavispe (701), classified as urban; and San Miguelito (456), La Mora (218), La Galerita (64), La Vega Azul (5), Oaxaca (3), Los Caballos (2), La Galera (1), Tasabiri (1), El Fuste (1) and Las Cuevas (1), classified as rural.

References

Municipalities of Sonora